"Don't Listen to the Radio" is a single from Australian rock band the Vines' third album Vision Valley. It was a minor hit in the UK and Australia, reaching positions of 66 and 46 on the countries' respective singles charts.
It was featured on the soundtrack of the video game FlatOut 2, and was also used in the game Thrillville.

Track listing

Charts

References

2006 singles
The Vines (band) songs
2006 songs
Songs written by Craig Nicholls
EMI Records singles
Black-and-white music videos